The 2003 Men's European Volleyball Championship Qualification was the qualifying event for the 23rd edition of the event. The qualifying matches were played in 2002 and 2003. The top five teams from the previous champiopnship — Serbia & Montenegro, Italy, Czech Republic, Russia, and Poland — plus the host country for the 2003 championships Germany were automatically qualified. The winners of each group qualified, as did the two best second-placed teams.

Group A

|}

Group B

|}

Group C

|}

Group D

|}

References
 CEV Results
 Results

Q
E
E
Qualification for volleyball competitions